The Coffeyville Community College Red Ravens are the sports teams of Coffeyville Community College, located in Coffeyville, Kansas, United States. They participate in the NJCAA and in the Kansas Jayhawk Community College Conference.

Sports

Men's sports
Baseball
Basketball
Cross country
Football
Golf
Rodeo
Soccer
Spirit squads
Track & field

Women's sports
Basketball
Cross country
Golf
Rodeo
Soccer
Softball
Spirit squads
Track & field
Volleyball

National Title seasons
The Coffeyville Red Ravens have won eight national titles since 1956.

Facilities
 Byers Field – home of the softball team
 Nellis Hall – home of the men and women's basketball teams
 Pumpkin Creek Equestrian Center – home of the rodeo teams
 Veteran's Memorial Stadium – home of the football, soccer, and track & field teams
 Walter Johnson Park – home of the baseball team

Notable alumni

 Akin Ayodele, NFL Linebacker, free agent
 James Carpenter, NFL offensive guard, Seattle Seahawks
 Andre De Grasse, Canadian Olympic sprinter
 Buster Douglas, world heavyweight boxing champion
 Maurice "Lil Mo" Douglass, former defensive back, Chicago Bears
 Reggie Evans, NBA player Brooklyn Nets
 Mel Gray, former return specialist, Detroit Lions
 Brandon Jacobs, NFL running back, New York Giants
 Ryan Lilja, former NFL offensive lineman, Indianapolis Colts and Kansas City Chiefs
 Reggie Nelson, NFL safety, Jacksonville Jaguars
 Quinton Patton, NFL wide receiver, San Francisco 49ers
 Mike Rozier, 1983 Heisman Trophy winner
 Devin Smith, professional basketball player, Maccabi Tel Aviv
 Paul Soliai, NFL defensive tackle, Miami Dolphins
 Ron Springs, football player
 Siran Stacy, former professional football player, Philadelphia Eagles
 Devin Thomas, NFL wide receiver, Washington Redskins
 Keith Traylor, former defensive lineman, Kansas City Chiefs
 Jeff Wright, NFL defensive tackle, Buffalo Bills

References

External links
 Official website